The Agreement Concerning Co-operation in Suppressing Illicit Maritime and Air Trafficking in Narcotic Drugs and Psychotropic Substances in the Caribbean Area, known in short form as the Caribbean Regional Maritime Agreement or Caribbean Regional Agreement (CRA), is a 2003 agreement regarding the suppression of the illegal drug trade in the Caribbean.

The CRA agreement has not been ratified by the required minimum five states (2007) although most Caribbean states have accepted the agreement in principle.

Notes

External links 
 Maritime and air counter narcotics agreement in Caribbean; AGREEMENT CONCERNING CO-OPERATION IN SUPPRESSING ILLICIT MARITIME AND AIR TRAFFICKING IN NARCOTIC DRUGS AND PSYCHOTROPIC SUBSTANCES IN THE CARIBBEAN AREA 
 International Narcotics Control Strategy Report, released by the U.S. Department of State's Bureau for International Narcotics and Law Enforcement Affairs

Drug policy
Politics of the Caribbean
Law enforcement in the Caribbean
United States–Caribbean relations